Apirak Worawong (born 7 January 1996) is a Thai professional footballer who plays as a goalkeeper for Thai League 1 club Chiangrai United.

Honours

International
Thailand U-21
 Nations Cup (1): 2016

Club
Chiangrai United
Thai League 1 (1): 2019
 Thai FA Cup (1): 2020–21
 Thailand Champions Cup (1): 2020

References

External links
 

1996 births
Living people
Apirak Worawong
Apirak Worawong
Association football goalkeepers
Apirak Worawong
Apirak Worawong
Apirak Worawong
Apirak Worawong
Apirak Worawong